Anonymous may refer to:

 Anonymity, the state of an individual's identity, or personally identifiable information, being publicly unknown
 Anonymous work, a work of art or literature that has an unnamed or unknown creator or author 
 Anonymity (social choice), a property of a voting rule, saying that it does not discriminate apriori between voters

Organizations 
 Anonymous (hacker group), the collective name of loosely affiliated individuals who participate in hacktivism

Film and television 
 "Anonymous" (Australian Playhouse), an Australian television play
 Anonymous (2011 film), a 2011 film 
 Anonymous (TV series), a 2006 Irish television show
 "Anonymous" (CSI), a 2000 episode of CSI: Crime Scene Investigation
 "Anonymous" (NCIS: Los Angeles), a 2010 episode of NCIS: Los Angeles

Music 
 Anonymous (band), an Andorran band
 Anonymous (Blackbear album) (2019)
 Anonymous (Stray from the Path album) (2013)
 Anonymous (Tomahawk album) (2007)
 Anonymous (Tyske Ludder album) (2009)
 "Anonymous" (Sleater-Kinney song) (1996)
 "Anonymous" (Spacehog song) (1998)
 "Anonymous" (Bobby Valentino song) (2007)
 "Anonymous", a song by Three Days Grace from Transit of Venus (2012)
 "A.N.O.N.Y.M.O.U.S.", a song by Reks from The Greatest X (2016)

People 
 Rodney Anonymous (born 1963), Philadelphia musician and humorist
 Joe Klein or Anonymous (born 1946), author of Primary Colors: A Novel of Politics
 Jayson Sherlock or Anonymous (born 1969), Christian metal musician from Australia
 Miles Taylor (security expert), former Donald Trump administration staffer, who wrote an op-ed and a book under the pen name "Anonymous"

Other uses 
 , a 2006 play by Naomi Iizuka

See also 
 Anon (disambiguation), for the abbreviation
 Anonymous IV, a 13th-century English student of medieval music theory
 Anonymous 4, a female a cappella quartet
 Anonymouse (collective), an anonymous Swedish artists collective
 Nomen nescio, used to signify an anonymous or non-specific person